In the context of the recent African origin of modern humans, the Southern Dispersal scenario (also the coastal migration or great coastal migration hypothesis) refers to the early migration along the southern coast of Asia, from the Arabian Peninsula via Persia and India to Southeast Asia and Oceania. Alternative names include the "southern coastal route" or "rapid coastal settlement", with later descendants of those migrations eventually colonizing the rest of Eurasia, the remainder of Oceania, and the Americas.

The coastal route theory is primarily used to describe the initial peopling of West Asia, India, Southeast Asia, New Guinea, Australia, Near Oceania, and East Asia beginning between roughly 70,000 and 50,000 years ago.

It is linked with the presence and dispersal of mtDNA haplogroup M and haplogroup N, as well as the specific distribution patterns of Y-DNA haplogroup F (ancestral to O, N, R, Q), haplogroup C and haplogroup D, in these regions.

The theory proposes that early modern humans, some of the bearers of mitochondrial haplogroup L3, arrived in the Arabian peninsula about 70,000-50,000 years ago, crossing from East Africa via the Bab-el-Mandeb strait. It has been estimated that from a population of 2,000 to 5,000 individuals in Africa, only a small group, possibly as few as 150 to 1,000 people, crossed the Red Sea. The group would have travelled along the coastal route around Arabia and Persia to India relatively rapidly, within a few thousand years. From India, they would have spread to Southeast Asia ("Sundaland") and Oceania ("Sahul").

A review paper by Melinda A. Yang (in 2022) summarized and concluded that a distinctive "Basal-East Asian population" referred to as 'East- and Southeast Asian lineage' (ESEA); which is ancestral to modern East Asians, Southeast Asians, Polynesians, and Siberians, originated in Mainland Southeast Asia at ~50,000BC, and expanded through multiple migration waves southwards and northwards respectively. This ESEA lineage gave rise to various sublineages, and is also ancestral to the Hoabinhian hunter-gatherers of Southeast Asia and the ~40,000 year old Tianyuan lineage found in Northern China, but already differentiated and distinct from European-related and Australasian-related lineages, found in other regions of prehistoric Eurasia. The ESEA lineage trifurcated from an earlier East-Eurasian or "eastern non-African" (ENA) meta-population, which also contributed to the formation of Ancient Ancestral South Indians (AASI) as well as to Australasians.

See also
Recent African origin of modern humans
Paleoanthropology

References

Human evolution
Population genetics
Prehistoric migrations
Peopling of the world
Coastal geography